Keith Jenkinson (3 November 1926 – 31 December 2014) was an Australian rules footballer who played with South Melbourne in the Victorian Football League (VFL).

Jenkinson died on 31 December 2014, at the age of 88.

References

External links 

1926 births
2014 deaths
Australian rules footballers from Victoria (Australia)
Sydney Swans players